Raffaele Costantino (14 June 1907 – 3 June 1991) was an Italian footballer from Bari, Apulia who played as a forward. At club level he played for hometown side AS Bari where he is remembered in high regard, he also played for a period of time at Roma.

Costantino earned the distinction of being the first ever Serie B player to be called up to the Italy national football team in 1930, he also scored in that game. All together he appeared for the national side twenty-three times and scored eight goals.
He was also one of 9 players being part of both the 1927–30 Central European International Cup, the 1931-32 Central European International Cup & the 1933–35 Central European International Cup successful campaigns.

By the time he retired in 1939, Costantino was the all-time top scorer for Bari, today he is 5th in the club's all-time scoring records.

He manager Bari on several occasions as well as several other clubs.

Honours
Bari
Serie B: 1934–35

International 
Italy
 Central European International Cup: 1927-30, 1933-35
 Central European International Cup: Runner-up: 1931-32

References

External links
 
 Italian Football Federation Profile 

1907 births
1991 deaths
Italian footballers
Italy international footballers
Serie A players
Serie B players
S.S.C. Bari players
A.S. Roma players
Association football forwards
Italian football managers
S.S.C. Bari managers
Calcio Foggia 1920 managers
U.S. Lecce managers
S.S. Fidelis Andria 1928 managers